Jang Myeong-hui (born 28 February 1969) is a South Korean rower. She competed in the women's double sculls event at the 1988 Summer Olympics.

References

1969 births
Living people
South Korean female rowers
Olympic rowers of South Korea
Rowers at the 1988 Summer Olympics
Place of birth missing (living people)